This is a list of notable Chinese scientists.

 Ba Denian
 Cai Xitao
 T. T. Chang
 JS Chiao
 Chang Chi-yun
 Chao Yuen Ren
 Chen Hang
 Chen Xing
 Chen Ziyuan
 Chien Wei-zang
 Coching Chu
 Ding Zhongli
 Jiamo Fu
 Gao Zhan
 Yingjie Jay Guo
 Guo Zhengtang
 He Xiantu
 Kenneth Hsu
 Hongjia Huang
 Jia Lanpo
 Jiang Ximing
 Jianping Li
 Robert C. T. Lee
 Li Lanjuan
 Li Sanli
 Li Shu-hua
 York Liao
 Liu Gaolian
 Yuanzhang Liu
 Ma Jun
 Ouyang Ziyuan
 Pan Jianwei
 Pan Jiazheng
 Pei Wenzhong
 Pu Zhelong
 Ren Mei'e
 Shao Xianghua
 Shen Kuo
 Shi Yafeng
 Song Yingxing
 Su Song
 Sun Jiadong
 Sun Laiyan
 Sun Jinliang
 Tan Jiazhen
 Tong Dizhou
 Tu Youyou
 Roger Y. Tsien
 Wang Yongzhi
 Wang You
 Wang Zhongcheng
 Wei Pu
 Weng Wenhao
 Wo Weihan
 Hsien Wu
 Wu Mengchao
 Xie Xuejing
 Yang Fuyu
 Xiangzhong Yang
 Yang Zhongjian
 Yao Zhen
 Ye Duzheng
 Ye Peijian
 Xiaobo Yu
 Yu Xiaogang
 Zhang Heng
 Zhang Sixun
 Zhang Yongzhen
 Zhao Jiuzhang
 Zhao Xijin
 Zhao Yufen
 Zheng Ji
 Bangxing Zhou
 Zhong Nanshan
 Zhou Guozhi
 Zhu S-H
Qian xue Sen,father of China rocketry and A bomb

See also 

 History of science and technology in China

 List of Chinese scientists
Chinese